Citrosuco is the largest global producer of orange juice concentrate, with about 45% of the product market in Brazil and 25% in the world.  In addition to juice, sales include industrialized orange by-products such as essential oils and animal feed. The company is headquartered in Matão, Brazil and is a subsidiary of Votorantim Group, a São Paulo-based industrial conglomerate. Citrosuco has offices in Brazil, the United States, Germany, Japan and Belgium. Its main competitor is the Brazilian firm Cutrale.

References 

Brazilian brands
Companies based in São Paulo (state)
Orange production
Soft drinks manufacturers
Votorantim Group
Food and drink companies of Brazil